The Hugh M. Hefner Moving Image Archive is an audiovisual archive located on the campus of University of Southern California Los Angeles, California. Founded as Audio-Visual Services (A-V Services) by Herbert E. Farmer, a former student, the archive was once an important distributor and producer of educational films. In 2007, the archive received a donation from Hugh Hefner and was renamed in his honor.

In October 2014, archive director Dino Everett premiered the anthology film "Shock Value The Movie: How Dan O'Bannon and Some USC Outsiders Helped Invent Modern Horror" at USC Norris Cinema Theatre, with a panel featuring Alec Lorimore, Terence Winkless, Diane O'Bannon, Mary Burkin, and New York Times reporter Jason Zinoman, who penned the book Shock Value that inspired the anthology. Everett plans to raise the funds to properly preserve each film in the anthology, which includes films by former USC alumni John Carpenter and Dan O'Bannon.

Collections
 Student Films and The Trojan Newsreel
 University Film and Video Association Collection
 Silent Film Collection
 Motion Picture History Booklist
 Herbert E. Farmer Technology Collection
 The Fred Engelberg Collection
 Helen Miller Bailey Travel Film Collection

References

External links

University of Southern California
Film archives in the United States
Cinema of Southern California